Samuel Reynolds Hole (5 December 1819 – 27 August 1904) was an English Anglican priest, author and horticulturalist in the late 19th century and the early part of the 20th.

Life

Hole was born at Ardwick near Manchester the only son of Samuel Hole of Caunton Manor and his wife, Mary Cooke of Macclesfield.

He was raised in Newark and educated at Mrs Gilbey's Preparatory School and Newark Grammar School there. After a period of foreign travel he studied theology at Brasenose College, Oxford. He was ordained in 1844 and spent 43 years at his father's parish of St. Andrew's Church, Caunton, firstly as curate and from 1850 as its vicar. A prebendary of Lincoln Cathedral and an honorary chaplain to Edward Benson, the then Archbishop of Canterbury, he became Dean of Rochester in 1887. Noted for his expertise with roses and an inaugural recipient of the Royal Horticultural Society's Victoria Medal of Honour.

There are two memorials to Hole at Rochester Cathedral. The most impressive is a recumbent marble life-size figure by F. W. Pomeroy.

Hole is further remembered on the number 3 bell at Rochester: "In remembrance of S. Reynolds Hole, Dean.  Died 27th August - 1904".

Family

In 1861 he married Caroline Francklin, daughter of John Francklin of Gonalston and Great Barford.

They had one son, Samuel Hugh Francklin Hole (b.1862) who became a barrister.

Publications

Hints to Freshmen (1847)
A Little Tour in Ireland (1859) illus. by John Leech
A Book about Roses (1869)
Hints to Preachers (1880)
Nice and her Neighbours (1881)
Addresses Spoken to Working Men (1894)
A Book about the Garden and the Gardener (1899)
Our Gardens (1899)
Then and Now (1901)

References

External links

 
 

1819 births
People from Newark-on-Trent
Alumni of Brasenose College, Oxford
English horticulturists
Deans of Rochester
Victoria Medal of Honour recipients
1904 deaths
People from Newark and Sherwood (district)
English Freemasons